Beatriz Iasmin Soares Ferreira (born 9 December 1992) is a Brazilian boxer.

She won a medal at the 2019 AIBA Women's World Boxing Championships.

She represented Brazil at the 2020 Summer Olympics. She won the silver medal in the women's lightweight event.

References

External links

1992 births
Living people
AIBA Women's World Boxing Championships medalists
Brazilian women boxers
Lightweight boxers
World lightweight boxing champions
Boxers at the 2019 Pan American Games
Pan American Games gold medalists for Brazil
Pan American Games medalists in boxing
South American Games medalists in boxing
South American Games gold medalists for Brazil
Medalists at the 2019 Pan American Games
Medalists at the 2020 Summer Olympics
Boxers at the 2020 Summer Olympics
Olympic medalists in boxing
Olympic silver medalists for Brazil
Olympic boxers of Brazil
Sportspeople from Salvador, Bahia
21st-century Brazilian women